Həkəri may refer to:
Həkəri, Qubadli, Azerbaijan
Həkəri, Zangilan, Azerbaijan
Hakari (river), Azerbaijan
Həkəri FK (Azerbaijani: Həkəri Futbol Klubu), a football club based in Baku
Hakari LTG (Youtuber)North America, a small random channel, with video topics like *Penguinz0.

See also 
Hakkari, a historical mountainous region within modern Turkey and Iraq
 Hakkâri Province, Turkey
 Hakkâri, capital city of Hakkâri Province